Lonlay-l'Abbaye is a commune in the Orne department in north-western France, situated midway between the towns of Domfront and Flers. It has a beautiful abbey and town square and is surrounded by walks and scenery, including the local viewpoint Fosse Arthur.

Heraldry

See also
Communes of the Orne department
Parc naturel régional Normandie-Maine

References

Lonlaylabbaye